HD 92788 b is an exoplanet located approximately 113 light-years away in the constellation of Sextans, orbiting the star HD 92788. The semimajor axis of this 3.68 Jupiter mass planet is 0.97 astronomical units, taking approximately 326 days to revolve.

References

External links
 
 

Sextans (constellation)
Giant planets
Exoplanets discovered in 2000
Exoplanets detected by radial velocity
Giant planets in the habitable zone